The Guild of Freemen of the City of London is an association of those who hold the Freedom of the City of London.

Membership of the Guild is open to all freemen, regardless of whether they are also members of a City livery company.

The purpose of the Guild, which was founded in 1908, is to bring Freemen of the City together for charitable, educational, benevolent, and social activities. An annual magazine called The Freeman is published in April of each year and includes reports on past and future activities.

With some two thousand members, activities  include dinners in notable City of London halls, clubs, and other buildings, an Annual Banquet with the Lord Mayor of London at Guildhall, musical and cultural events, and a carol service.

The Guild has its offices at 4 Dowgate Hill in the City.
A Master is elected annually, who holds office for one year. Anne, Princess Royal, was Master in the centenary year of 2008.

Past Masters
The following have served as Master:

 Cuthbert Wilkinson CC (1909)
 H. Brodie Self (1910)
 Sir Thomas Brooke-Hitching CC (1911)
 Emile Chatrian (1912)
 Alderman George Briggs (1913)
 H. Elliott Sparks (1914)
 Harry S. A. Foy CC (1915)
 J R Brough (1916)
 Alfred Lockett (1917)
 W. J. Trice (1918)
 Henry Harrill (1919)
 Sir Edward Wilshaw KCMG (1920)
 Francis Sully (1921)
 T. W. Hewitt CC (1922)
 Sir Lulham Pound, Bt. (1923)
Sir Gervais Rentoul (1924)
Sir Richard Sennett CC (1929)
C. G. H. Wittich (1930)
Rt Hon. Sir Herbert Nield KC MP (1931)
Lieut.-Col. Sir Hugh Turnbull KVCO KBE (1932)
H. Holton Sturges FCA CC (1933)
H. J. Eldridge FSAA (1934)
Captain M. Campbell-Johnston MP (1935)
Major Francis H. Millman OBE (1936)
A. Ernest Watts FCA CC (1937)
John Joy JP CC (1938)
Captain Francis C. J. Read FSI (1939)
T. J. McManis JP CC (1940)
James J. Gibaud (1941)
Arthur E. Howard (1942)
Walter Rose MBE FCIS CC (1943)
Deputy Frederick Youldon (1944)
Arthur L. R. Harris ARPS (1945)
George F. Frizell (1946)
Sir William Jordan (1947)
Henry C Bound CC (1948)
Sir Frank Alexander, 1st Baronet (1949)
John Crighton (1950)
Sir Frederick Tidbury-Beer (1951)
Major B. W. Shilson OBE (1952)
Captain Julien F. C. Bennett DL (1953)
Lieut-Col C. G. Surtees-Shill CC (1954)
Deputy H. J. E. Stinson MC (1955)
Major Stanley W. Wells MBE (1956)
Sir Denis Truscott GBE (1957) 
Deputy Percy T. Lovely (1958)
Sir David Floyd Ewin OBE MVO (1959)
Sir Sidney J. Fox FRICS CC (1960)
Charles De Ryck (1961)
Stanley A. Phillips (1962)
Ronald Ward FRIBA (1963)
Frederick W. Utting CC (1964)
Sir Harold Webbe (1965)
Roy R. Stuart (1966)
Sir Stanley Morton (1970)
Reginald Crook, 1st Baron Crook (1972)
Sir Anthony Grant (1979 and 1997)
Sir Peter Gadsden GBE (1984)
General Sir Peter Whiteley GCB (1987)
 Rex S. Johnson (1991)
Derek L. Kemp (1992)
Sir Clifford Chetwood (1993)
Sir Colin Cole (1994)
Sir Clive Martin (1995)
Vice-Admiral Sir Peter Buchanan (1996)
 Gordon M. Gentry (2007)
 Anne, Princess Royal (Centenary Master, 2008)
 Pauline Halliday OBE (2008)
Sir Gavyn Farr Arthur (2009)
 Anthony Woodhead (2010)
 J. Don Lunn (2011)
 Anne E. Holden (2012)
 Anthony B. Fleming (2013)
 Dr John A. Smail (2014)
Poppy, Lady Cooksey (2015)
 Sir David Wootton (2016)
 Peter Allcard (2017)
 John Barber (2018)
 Neil Redcliffe (2019)
 Ann-Marie Jefferys (2020)

Notes

City of London
Guilds in England